Borzymów  is a village in the administrative district of Gmina Oleśnica, within Staszów County, Świętokrzyskie Voivodeship, in south-central Poland.

The village has a population of  314.

Demography 
According to the 2002 Poland census, there were 325 people residing in Borzymów village, of whom 48.3% were male and 51.7% were female. In the village, the population was spread out, with 21.5% under the age of 18, 32% from 18 to 44, 18.8% from 45 to 64, and 27.4% who were 65 years of age or older.
 Figure 1. Population pyramid of village in 2002 – by age group and sex

References

Villages in Staszów County